Donovan Catholic High School, (formerly Monsignor Donovan High School) located in Toms River, is the only Roman Catholic high school in Ocean County, New Jersey, United States, and operates under the supervision of the Roman Catholic Diocese of Trenton. Located in the coastal community of Toms River Township, the school originally opened in 1962 as St. Joseph High School, but was renamed as Monsignor Donovan High School after its founder, Msgr. Lawrence Donovan in 1983, before adopting its current name in 2014.

Donovan Catholic became an IB World School in January of 2017, offering students the IB Diploma Programme. The school is accredited by AdvancED.

As of the 2017-18 school year, the school had an enrollment of 708 students and 61.5 classroom teachers (on an FTE basis), for a student–teacher ratio of 11.1:1. The school's student body was 85.6% White, 6.9% Asian, 3.1% Hispanic, 1.8% Black, 0.6% Native Hawaiian / Pacific Islander, 0.4% American Indian / Alaska Native and 1.8% two or more races.

The school mascot is the Griffin. In the 1960s, the school (then St. Joseph High School) sponsored a contest to name the mascot.  Finalists were chosen by the faculty from the submissions, and then the students voted on the finalists. The winning name was George.

Academics
Donovan Catholic has created an enhanced learning community though the educational vehicle known as block scheduling. This model, implemented in the fall of 1998, includes two eighteen-week (Fall and Spring) terms. Terms may be divided into quarters depending on curriculum needs. Students take four courses each term. Each course meets for approximately twice the standard instructional time than is offered under the traditional schedule. In order to graduate, students must complete four years of religious studies, have completed seventy hours of Christian Service, and have taken twenty credits of English, ten credits of United States History, five credits of World History, fifteen credits of Mathematics, fifteen credits of Science, ten credits of the same Foreign Language, three credits of Fine and Practical Arts, and ten credits of Physic and Health/Driver Education.

Monsignor Donovan offers a variety of Advanced Placement courses, including English Literature and Composition, United States History, World History, Psychology, Calculus AB & BC, Biology, Environmental Science, Chemistry, and Physics.

Students who excel at Donovan Catholic and who meet particular standards of academics, service, leadership, and character may apply for entry to the National Honor Society.

Dress code
Students are required to wear uniforms.  Girls must wear navy knee socks or tights, and a navy plaid pleated skirt.  They may also wear white dress shirts with a navy blue sweater in the winter or blue golf shirts in the fall and spring. The boys wear khaki pants, belt, black or tan Sperry top-siders, dress shirts with a tie and navy blue sweater for the winter, or the blue golf shirts in the fall and spring.

Athletics
The Donovan Catholic High School Griffins compete in Division B South of the Shore Conference, an athletic conference comprised of public and private high schools in Monmouth and Ocean counties along the Jersey Shore. The league operates under the jurisdiction of the New Jersey State Interscholastic Athletic Association. With 540 students in grades 10-12, the school was classified by the NJSIAA for the 2019–20 school year as Non-Public A for most athletic competition purposes, which included schools with an enrollment of 381 to 1,454 students in that grade range (which is equivalent to Group II for public schools). The school was classified by the NJSIAA as Non-Public Group III for football for 2018–2020.

The athletic teams compete in the following sports: football, soccer, powerlifting, baseball, hockey, basketball, swimming, gymnastics, cheerleading, softball, lacrosse, tennis, golf, wrestling, track and field, volleyball, sailing, bowling, and cross country running.

The school participates with Red Bank Catholic High School in a joint ice hockey team in which St. Rose High School is the host school / lead agency. The co-op program operates under agreements scheduled to expire at the end of the 2023–24 school year.

The girls spring track team was the Non-Public A state champion in 2004.

The girls cross country team won the Non-Public A state championship in 2004 and 2007.

The Donovan Catholic sailing team won the New Jersey High School Sailing Championship in 2005, 2006 and 2007. They also won the CT State High School Sailing Championship in 2005 and 2008. In a period of six years, the M.D.H.S. Sailing Team has qualified for the Interscholastic Sailing Association National Championship four times.

The Donovan Catholic boys' bowling team succeeded in the winter of 2006-07, finishing with a 34-11 record and taking home the titles of divisional champions, Shore Conference tournament champions and South Jersey Group II state sectional champions.

The boys track team won the spring track state championship in Non-Public A in 2008.

The boys' and girls' varsity bowling teams both took 1st place in the Shore Conference in the 2009-10 season, and the Boys took 2nd place in the Sectionals Tournament, and in the States tournament, took 2nd place in their group

The Donovan Catholic girls' swimming team won the Ocean County Championship for the first time in school history during the 2007-08 season, a first for a non-public school, then repeated in 2008-09.

In 2008, the men's track and field team won the state championship.

The 2019 softball team defeated Mount Saint Dominic Academy by a score of 11-1 in the final of the tournament to win the Non-Public A state championship, the program's first state title. The 2019 team went into the Tournament of Champions as the top-seeded team and finished the season with a 30-2 record after winning the overall title by a score of 10-0 in five innings under the mercy rule against runner-up Cedar Grove High School, the second-seeded team. NJ.com ranked Donovan Catholic as their number-one softball team in the state in 2019.

The Donovan Catholic Cheerleading Competition team finished the 2011-2012 season with the best record in school history:
National Champions:  First Place, Varsity Level 4, Cheersport National Championships, Atlanta, GA
Grand Champions and Spirit Award:  Spirit Unlimited National Championships, Atlantic City, NJ
Grand Champions: Lindenboro Chargers  Cheer Classic, Sicklerville, NJ
Grand Champions: Gotta Cheer Snow Globe Challenge, Chester, NJ
Grand Champions: Gotta Cheer Snowdown Showdown, Medford, NJ  
1st Place: Cheersport Regional Championship, Philadelphia, PA; Liberty Lion Championship, Jackson, NJ
2nd Place: Cheer Tech Championships, Wildwood, NJ; Jaguar Competition, Jackson, NJ; States, Trenton, NJ

Extracurricular activities
The school's mock trial team won the Ocean County tournament in 2008 and 2009.

Notable alumni
 John Cudia (born 1970, class of 1988), Broadway actor.
 Page Falkinburg (born 1956, class of 1974, but transferred to Point Pleasant Boro High School before graduating), wrestler.
 Scott Palguta (born 1982, class of 2001), Head Mens Soccer Coach at Colorado College. Former professional soccer player with the Colorado Rapids of Major League Soccer.
 Mike Straka (class of 1988), Fox News journalist.

 Glenn Taranto (born 1959, Class of 1977), actor and screenwriter.

References

External links
Donovan Catholic High School website
Donovan Catholic High School, National Center for Education Statistics

1962 establishments in New Jersey
Educational institutions established in 1962
Private high schools in Ocean County, New Jersey
Roman Catholic Diocese of Trenton
Catholic secondary schools in New Jersey
Toms River, New Jersey